Havelock MRT station is an underground Mass Rapid Transit station on the Thomson–East Coast line in the Bukit Merah planning area, Singapore. Spanning Zion Road, it serves Bukit Ho Swee residential estate and the historic Tiong Bahru estate, as well as Tan Boon Liat Building and Holiday Inn.

History

Havelock station was first announced as part of the 22-station Thomson line on 29 August 2012. In February 2014, the Land Transport Authority (LTA) awarded Contract T221 to Gammon Construction Limited at S$210 million (US$ million). The scope of the contract include the design and construction of Havelock Station. Construction started in 2014, with an expected completion date of 2021.

On 15 August 2014, the LTA announced that the TSL would merge with the Eastern Region line to form the Thomson–East Coast line (TEL). Havelock station, part of the proposed line, would be constructed as part of TEL3, consisting of 13 stations between Mount Pleasant and Gardens by the Bay. 

Construction required the building of entrances into hills, with Entrance 3 serving as a staircase to the residential blocks behind; residents negotiated for it to open in January 2022. With restrictions imposed on construction due to the COVID-19 pandemic, the TEL3 completion date was pushed back to June 2022. On 9 March 2022, Transport Minister S Iswaran announced in Parliament that TEL 3 would open in the second half of that year.

As announced during a visit by Transport Minister S. Iswaran on 7 October 2022, the TEL station opened on 13 November 2022.

References

Mass Rapid Transit (Singapore) stations
Railway stations in Singapore opened in 2022